Streptomyces sclerotialus is a thermophillic bacterium species from the genus of Streptomyces which was isolated from soil. Streptomyces sclerotialus has the 
ability to degrade benzoate.

See also 
 List of Streptomyces species

References

Further reading

External links
Type strain of Streptomyces sclerotialus at BacDive -  the Bacterial Diversity Metadatabase

sclerotialus
Bacteria described in 1970